Shah Qotb ol Din Heydar (also Romanized as Shāh Qoţb ol Dīn Ḩeydar and Shāh Qoţb od Dīn Ḩeydar) is a village in Darz and Sayeban Rural District, in the Central District of Larestan County, Fars Province, Iran. At the 2006 census, its population was 200, in 37 families.

References 

Populated places in Larestan County